Živko Lukić (Serbian Cyrillic: Живко Лукић; 1943/1944 – 2015) was a Serbian footballer who played as a midfielder. He is known for being the first foreign player in Paris Saint-Germain history, making his way onto the team in a deceptive manner.

Career 
Lukić was a youth player for Partizan from 1961 to 1963. He made one appearance for the B team of the club on 6 June 1963, coming off the bench in a friendly against German club SV Merbeck. In the space of 7 years, from 1963 to 1970, Lukić went on to play for Rijeka, Maribor, and Osijek, while at the same time training to become a dentist.

In 1970, Paris Saint-Germain (PSG) was formed with the merging of Paris FC and Stade Saint-Germain; Lukić took advantage of the ambitious but not particularly organized project in Paris to hoax his way into the team. He convinced the entire PSG staff into believing that he had been an important player for Partizan in the past, and that he was the brother of Rennes player Ilija Lukić. Up to this point, Lukić's plan was succeeding; he even received a welcome from the well-known magazine France Football several days before his debut for PSG.

On 29 August 1970, Lukić played in his first and only game with Paris Saint-Germain, coming on as a substitute in a 3–2 Division 2 win over Quevilly. "His mission was to neutralise our opponent’s key player, Horlaville, whom we feared the most. And Lukić… he clung to him like an octopus to a rock! But Horlaville would quickly dribble past him once, then again, then make a pass, while my unfortunate Lukić would inevitably end up on his behind!" wrote former PSG president Guy Crescent in his 1992 autobiography.

Lukić only played a total of 53 minutes for PSG, and his deception was revealed after his appearance in a match. Despite his identity hoax, he was able to obtain a medal at the end of the season, as the Parisian club gained promotion to the Division 1 in 1971.

Personal life and death 
After his football days, Lukić lived the rest of his life running a dental clinic in Železnik. The clinic closed in 2012. He died in 2015.

Career statistics

Honours 
Paris Saint-Germain
 Division 2: 1970–71

References

External links 

 

1944 births
2015 deaths
Association football midfielders
Serbian footballers
Date of death unknown
Yugoslav footballers
Footballers from Belgrade
Serbian dentists
FK Partizan players
HNK Rijeka players
NK Maribor players
NK Osijek players
Paris Saint-Germain F.C. players
Ligue 2 players
Serbian expatriate footballers
Yugoslav expatriate footballers
Expatriate footballers in France
Serbian expatriate sportspeople in France
Yugoslav expatriate sportspeople in France
20th-century dentists